The Maryland Hotel is an historic building near San Diego's Gaslamp Quarter, in the U.S. state of California.

References

External links
 

Buildings and structures in San Diego
Hotels in San Diego